Zygaenosia flavonigra is a moth in the family Erebidae. It was described by van Eecke in 1924. It is found in Papua New Guinea.

References

Nudariina
Moths described in 1924
Zygaenosia